Oliver James Carter (born 2 November 2001) is an English cricketer. He made his first-class debut on 4 July 2021, for Sussex in the 2021 County Championship. He made his Twenty20 debut on 9 July 2021, for Sussex in the 2021 T20 Blast. He made his List A debut on 23 July 2021, for Sussex in the 2021 Royal London One-Day Cup. In June 2022, in the 2022 County Championship match against Glamorgan, Carter scored his maiden century in first-class cricket.

References

External links
 

2001 births
Living people
English cricketers
Sussex cricketers
Sportspeople from Eastbourne